Rosedale is a small town in the south western Barossa Valley in South Australia. Prior to renaming placenames of enemy origin in 1918, Rosedale was named Rosenthal.

The locality of Rosedale spans the North Para River which is the boundary between two local government areas. North of the river is in the Light Regional Council. South of it is in the Barossa Council. The Turretfield Research Centre is on the north bank of the river just outside the township.

References

External links

Towns in South Australia